Grant County (county code GT) is a county located in the U.S. state of Kansas. As of the 2020 census, the county population was 7,352. Its county seat and only city is Ulysses. Both the county and its seat are named after Ulysses S. Grant, 18th President of the United States.

History

In 1873, the part of Kansas west of Range 25 was divided into 25 new counties. The new counties were Decatur, Rawlins, Cheyenne, Sheridan, Thomas, Sherman, Lane, Buffalo, Foote, Meade, Scott, Sequoyah, Arapahoe, Seward, Wichita, Kearny, Greeley, Hamilton, Stanton, Kansas, Stevens, and Grant.

Grant County, Kansas was named after Ulysses S. Grant, the 18th President of the United States (1869–1877), and incumbent president at the time of the county's formation. The initial survey establishing county boundaries was in the summer of 1874.

In 1883, Kearny, Sequoyah, Arapahoe, Kansas, Stevens, Meade, Clark and Grant counties disappeared.  Hamilton, Ford, Seward, and Hodgeman counties enlarged and Finney County was created.  Grant County was split with the western portion becoming a part of Hamilton County and the eastern portion becoming a part of the newly created Finney County.

On June 9, 1888, Grant County was again established as a Kansas county, with original county boundaries, with the first officers of the new Grant County being sworn in on June 18, 1888.

In October 1888, the county seat election for Grant County resulted in victory for Ulysses, Kansas, election results were:.

Early Day Settlements
 "Old" Ulysses, subsequently moved to New Ulysses in 1909
 Surprise-Tilden
 Cincinnati-Appomattox
 Shockey (Shockeyville)
 Golden
 Zionville
 Lawson
 Waterford
 Gognac
 Spurgeon

Geography

Major highways
 U.S. Highway 160
 Kansas Highway 25

Adjacent counties
 Kearny County (north)
 Finney County (northeast)
 Haskell County (east)
 Stevens County (south)
 Stanton County (west)
 Hamilton County (northwest)

Demographics

As of the 2000 census, there were 7,909 people, 2,742 households, and 2,097 families residing in the county.  The population density was 14 people per square mile (5/km2).  There were 3,027 housing units at an average density of 5 per square mile (2/km2).  The racial makeup of the county was 77.00% White, 0.86% Native American, 0.37% Asian, 0.21% Black or African American, 19.46% from other races, and 2.10% from two or more races. Hispanic or Latino of any race were 34.67% of the population.

There were 2,742 households, out of which 43.60% had children under the age of 18 living with them, 66.40% were married couples living together, 7.10% had a female householder with no husband present, and 23.50% were non-families. 21.00% of all households were made up of individuals, and 8.20% had someone living alone who was 65 years of age or older.  The average household size was 2.86 and the average family size was 3.34.

In the county, the population was spread out, with 32.80% under the age of 18, 8.70% from 18 to 24, 28.70% from 25 to 44, 20.20% from 45 to 64, and 9.60% who were 65 years of age or older.  The median age was 31 years. For every 100 females there were 100.70 males.  For every 100 females age 18 and over, there were 97.50 males.

The median income for a household in the county was $39,854, and the median income for a family was $44,914. Males had a median income of $34,464 versus $22,000 for females. The per capita income for the county was $17,072.  About 6.50% of families and 10.10% of the population were below the poverty line, including 13.60% of those under age 18 and 7.50% of those age 65 or over.

Government

Presidential elections
Grant County is heavily Republican. Lyndon B. Johnson was the last Democrat to win the county, and Jimmy Carter narrowly lost the county in 1976. Michael Dukakis (as of 2020) is the last Democrat to win more than a quarter of the county's vote.

Laws
Grant County was a prohibition, or "dry", county until the Kansas Constitution was amended in 1986 and voters approved the sale of alcoholic liquor by the individual drink with a 30% food sales requirement.

Education

Unified school districts
 Ulysses USD 214

Communities

City
 Ulysses

Unincorporated communities
 Hickok
 Ryus
 Stano
 Sullivans Tracks

Townships
Grant County is divided into three townships.  None of the cities within the county are considered governmentally independent, and all figures for the townships include those of the cities.  In the following table, the population center is the largest city (or cities) included in that township's population total, if it is of a significant size.

See also
 Dry counties

References

Further reading

External links

County
 
 Grant County - Directory of Public Officials
Maps
 Grant County Map, GrantCoKs.org
 Grant County Maps: Current, Historic, KDOT
 Kansas Highway Maps: Current, Historic, KDOT
 Kansas Railroad Maps: Current, 1996, 1915, KDOT and Kansas Historical Society

 
Kansas counties
1873 establishments in Kansas
Populated places established in 1873